Paul Thompson is an Australian former professional rugby league footballer who played in the 1980s. He played for Illawarra and Canberra in the New South Wales Rugby League (NSWRL) competition.

Playing career
Thompson made his first-grade debut in round 5 of the 1982 NSWRFL season against North Sydney at the Wollongong Showground. Thompson played 15 games for Illawarra in their inaugural season scoring one try. Thompson would go on to make a total of 35 appearances for Illawarra scoring six tries. In 1985, Thompson joined Canberra and played three games.

References

Illawarra Steelers players
Canberra Raiders players
Australian rugby league players
Rugby league five-eighths
1961 births
Living people
Place of birth missing (living people)